"I Want You to Know" is the third single from the Per Gessle album, The World According to Gessle.

Track listings and formats
CD single
 "I Want You to Know"
 "Blue Umbrella" (demo)
Maxi CD
 "I Want You to Know"
 "Blue Umbrella" (demo)
 "Jupiter Calling" (demo)
 "Let's Party" (demo)

Charts

References

1997 singles
Per Gessle songs
Music videos directed by Jonas Åkerlund
Songs written by Per Gessle